The academy sergeant major is the senior non-commissioned officer instructor at a military academy.

British Army
At the British Army's Royal Military Academy Sandhurst, the academy sergeant major (AcSM) holds the rank of warrant officer class 1. Almost always held by a guardsman, it is one of the most senior warrant officer appointments in the British Army.

List of academy sergeant majors

Australian Defence Force
At the Australian Defence Force Academy, the academy sergeant major (ASM) also holds the rank of warrant officer class 1 or equivalent and is drawn on rotation from all three services.

Sri Lanka Army
At the Sri Lanka Military Academy, the academy sergeant major (ASM) is of the rank of warrant officer class I.

Notes

References

Military appointments of the British Army
Military appointments of Australia
Guards Division (United Kingdom)
Warrant officers